Pyaar Kiya Nahi Jaathan is a 2003 Hindi Romance film directed by Mahesh Manjrekar. The film features Diwakar Pundir and Sonali Bendre in the lead roles. The film deals with a Love tale.

Cast 
 Diwakar Pundir as Vikram 'Vicky' Singh
 Sonali Bendre as Disha
 Nikhil Chinapa as Ravi Pillai
 Navin Nischol as Shekhar Pillai
 Paresh Rawal as Venkat
 Kalpana Pandit as Payal Khurana 
 Om Puri as Om Prakash Khurana
 Shivaji Satam as Akram
 Usha Bachani as Anju
 Gurpreet Kaul as Gayetri Singh
 Master Varun as Rahul Singh

Soundtrack

References

External links
 

2003 films
2000s Hindi-language films
Indian romantic musical films
Films directed by Mahesh Manjrekar
Films scored by Anand Raj Anand
2000s romantic musical films